
Year 418 BC was a year of the pre-Julian Roman calendar. At the time, it was known as the Year of the Tribunate of Fidenas, Axilla and Mugillanus (or, less frequently, year 336 Ab urbe condita). The denomination 418 BC for this year has been used since the early medieval period, when the Anno Domini calendar era became the prevalent method in Europe for naming years.

Events 
 By place 
 Greece 
 King Agis II of Sparta escapes having his house razed and being fined 100,000 drachmae for his failure to press his advantage by promising more successful outcomes in the future.
 The Battle of Mantinea is the largest land battle of the Peloponnesian War (with as many as 10,000 troops on each side). Sparta under King Agis II has a major victory over Argos (and its allies Athens, Ellis and Mantinea), which has broken its treaty with Sparta's King Agis II at the insistence of Alcibiades. Agis II's major victory makes amends with the Spartans for his earlier truce with Argos. The commander of the Athenian forces, Laches, is killed in the battle.
 Impressed with the Spartan victory, the inhabitants of Argos change their government from democracy to oligarchy and end their support for Athens in favour of an alliance with Sparta. Many of Argos' allies do the same. Athens becomes increasingly isolated.
 Alcibiades urges the Athenians to conquer Syracuse, subdue Sicily and Carthage and thus gain added forces that will enable them to finish the war against Sparta. His bold offensive plan wins the support of the Athenians.

Births 
 Epaminondas of Thebes, Theban general and statesman (d. 362 BC)
 Iphicrates, Athenian general (approximate date) (d. c. 353 BC)

Deaths 
 Laches, Athenian aristocrat and general (b. c. 475 BC)

References